Prosoplus interruptus is a species of beetle in the family Cerambycidae. It was described by Francis Polkinghorne Pascoe in 1864. It is known from Papua New Guinea and Moluccas.

References

Prosoplus
Beetles described in 1864